Power Spike: Pro Beach Volleyball, known in Europe as Beach 'n Ball (Game Boy Color) or Beach Volleyball (PlayStation), is a video game developed by French studio Carapace Game Development and Spark, and published by Infogrames for Game Boy Color, PlayStation and Microsoft Windows in 2000-2001.

Reception

The PC version received "mixed" reviews, while the PlayStation version received "generally unfavorable reviews", according to the review aggregation website Metacritic. Kathryn Renta of NextGen said, "There's only one volleyball game available on the PlayStation – and apparently, it's one too many. That's the sad truth about Power Spike. It could have been enjoyable, but the graphics are ugly, the music repetitive, and it's a chore to play."

References

External links
 
 

2000 video games
Beach volleyball video games
Game Boy Color games
Infogrames games
PlayStation (console) games
Video games developed in France
Windows games